Michael H Abraham was a prominent chemist and also an artist. He worked in the fields of physical and organic chemistry at University College London, where he held the seat of professor. Specifically, his research interests included hydrogen bonding, linear free energy relationships (LFER), quantitative structure-activity relationships (QSAR) and solute-solvent interactions. His work has led to him being on Thomson Reuters' list of most cited scientists. As well as his research science, he was a hobby artist. Examples of his work can be found on his research page in external links.

Michael Abraham died January 19th 2021, aged 89.

Key works done by Michael Abraham and UCL co-workers include the measuring and calculation of molecular properties of thousands of molecules. These properties include H-bond acidity and basicity, dipolarity and polarisability.

References

External links 
 List of Publications
 UCL Profile Page 

Year of birth missing (living people)
English chemists
Living people